Ząb  (until 1965 Zubsuche) is a village in the administrative district of Gmina Poronin, within Tatra County, Lesser Poland Voivodeship, in southern Poland.

The village has a population of 2,300.

Notable people
 Stanisław Bobak, Polish ski jumper
 Józef Łuszczek, Polish cross-country skier
 Kamil Stoch, Polish ski jumper

References

Villages in Tatra County